Secret Love is a 1916 American silent drama film directed by Robert Z. Leonard and featuring Harry Carey. This is the first film made under Universal's "Bluebird" banner. A copy of this film survives at the Library of Congress, in nitrate form.

Cast
 Jack Curtis as Don Lowrie
 Helen Ware as Joan Lowrie
 Dixie Carr as Liz (as Dixey Carr)
 Harry Carey as Fergus Derrick
 Harry Carter as Ralph Lonsdale
 Marc Robbins as The Rector
 Harry Southard as Paul Grace
 Warren Ellsworth as Mine Foreman
 Ella Hall as Arnice
 Willis Marks as Craddock
 Lule Warrenton as Mother

References

External links

1916 films
Silent American drama films
American silent feature films
American black-and-white films
1916 drama films
Films based on works by Frances Hodgson Burnett
Films directed by Robert Z. Leonard
Universal Pictures films
1910s American films